Nylon Pink is a travel & fashion magazine and former rock band, calling itself the "only all-Asian American female band in the United States."

Band Composition
The band was formed in 2008 and based in Hollywood, California, started primarily by Kaila Yu and Katt Lee, and initially comprised Kaila Yu on the lead vocals, Katt Lee (aka Kitt E. Katt) on bass, Theresa Houston on guitar, TJ McDonnell on the drums and DJ Shy (Karen Jin Beck) on the turntables. DJ Shy became an honorary member and joined the group only occasionally. Genn became the rhythm guitarist, with Kiki Wongo joining as lead guitarist and Deb on the drums. The group became a quintet and, more recently, become a three-member band comprising Kiki Wongo as lead guitar and vocals, Katt Lee as bassist, and Yuki Ito (aka YukiBomb) as keyboardist and background vocals.  Also, Jamie Scoles has been the drummer of Nylon Pink, and is as such in many of their videos.

Songs and Style
Their style has been described as "Hello Kitty on Acid" and Katy Perry crossed with Shiny Toy Guns with a Harajuku edge. A jewelry and fashion line inspired by their music is known as "Hello Drama," which was founded by Kaila Yu.

Appearances and Media Coverage
LA Weekly called Nylon Pink one of Los Angeles's “sexiest, glitziest bands”, and Reverb Nation hailed them as the “2011 Artist on the Verge”. They earned a nomination for “Pop Artist of the Year” at the LA Music Awards.

Nylon Pink has appeared in photospreads for publications such as FHM Singapore.

They have toured in Thailand, China, and South America.

References

External links

Nylon Pink on Last FM
Nylon Pink drummer Jamie Scoles website
Nylon Pink Youtube Page

Rock music groups from California
Asian-American culture
American musicians of Asian descent